Kent County is a county located in the U.S. state of Maryland. As of the 2020 census, its population was 19,198, making it the least populous county in Maryland. Its county seat is Chestertown. The county was named for the county of Kent in England. 

The county is located on the Eastern Shore of Maryland. Along with Caroline and Garrett Counties, it is one of three counties in the state that are not part of a metropolitan statistical area.

History
In 1608, Captain John Smith explored and mapped a portion of what is now Kent County. In 1642, the governor and council appointed commissioners for the Isle and County of Kent. This act appears to have led to the establishment of Kent County. In 1675, the first county seat was New Yarmouth. The seat was briefly moved upriver to Quaker Neck, and then to the site of modern Chestertown. Before the American Revolution, New Town on Chester, now Chestertown, was a port entry for the counties of Cecil, Kent, and Queen Anne's.

The county has a number of properties which are listed on the National Register of Historic Places.

Kent County was the mean center of U.S. population in the 1790 census.

In 1793, the county had its first newspaper, called Apollo, or Chestertown Spy. It was succeeded by local papers such as the Chestertown Gazette.

Washington College, the oldest college in Maryland, is located in Kent County.  It was the first college charted in the nation after the Declaration of Independence and was founded by William Smith in 1782. George Washington authorized the use of his name and gave the college its largest gift of 50 guineas. Washington served on the Board of Visitors and Governors for five years.  The college has been host to four United States Presidents, including George Washington, Harry S. Truman, Dwight D. Eisenhower, and Franklin D. Roosevelt. All were awarded honorary degrees from the college.

War of 1812
The War of 1812 was the only war Kent County experienced on its soil. During the spring and summer of both 1813 and 1814, residents faced immediate threats from the enemy as the British terrorized the Chesapeake, looting and burning farms and towns.  Kent County citizens and local militia were tested and stood their ground with ingenuity and determination during the burning of Georgetown, the rescue of the Kitty Knight House and the Battle of Caulk's Field.

Historical churches 
St. Paul's, the oldest Episcopal Church in Maryland used continuously as a place of worship. The earliest part of the building was constructed in 1711. It is located approximately nine miles west of Chestertown.

Christ Church, frequently called I.U., was founded in 1765. Colonel Philip Reed a Continental Army and War of 1812 soldier is buried here.

Shrewsbury Church is believed to be the first structure erected in the county, in 1693. John Cadwalader is buried in the Shrewsbury churchyard. The eulogy on his tomb was written by Thomas Paine.

Politics and government
Kent County was granted home rule in 1970 under a state code.

In the early post-Civil War era, Kent County was heavily Confederate-leaning and leaned towards the Democratic Party. William McKinley was the only Republican to carry the county between 1876 and 1924. After that, although carried by Franklin Roosevelt and Harry Truman during the five consecutive Democratic victories between 1932 and 1948, the county trended Republican relative to national voting. Currently, along with Somerset County further south, Kent County is the most politically competitive county on the Eastern Shore of Maryland. In 2004, Republican George W. Bush won it with 52.8% of the vote to Democrat John Kerry's 46.1%. In the 2008 United States Presidential Election, Barack Obama won Kent County by 48 votes more than John McCain.  In 2012, Republican Mitt Romney won Kent County by 28 votes over Democrat Barack Obama. In 2016, Republican Donald Trump won Kent County with 48.7% of the vote to Democrat Hillary Clinton's 45.7%, and a 20-year record high of 5.7% of the vote for third-party candidates. In 2020, Joe Biden flipped the county, winning it by 134 votes.

The members of the County Council as of 2018 are:

Kent County lies wholly in Senate District 36 and elects three House of Delegates Members who serve at-large countywide. Members listed below as of 2018 are:

|}

The head of the Kent County Sheriff's Office is John Price IV.

Geography

According to the Maryland Geological Survey, the highest point in Kent County is 102 ft above sea level, approximately 2.25 mi west of Coleman's Corner (shown on maps as "Coleman"), just northeast of the mouth of Still Pond Creek.

Kent County has a 209-mile shoreline, including Eastern Neck Island. The Chesapeake Bay is on the west, Sassafras River on the north, and the Chester River on the south. The eastern border with Delaware is part of the Mason–Dixon line.

Adjacent counties
Cecil County (north)
New Castle County, Delaware (northeast)
Harford County (northwest)
Queen Anne's County (south)
Kent County, Delaware (southeast)
Anne Arundel County (southwest)
Baltimore County (west)

National protected area
 Eastern Neck National Wildlife Refuge

Major highways

U.S. Route 301 is the major highway passing through Kent County.

Demographics

2010 census

As of the 2010 U.S. census, there were 20,197 people, 8,165 households, and 5,272 families living in the county. The racial makeup of the county was 80.1% white, 15.1% black or African American, 0.8% Asian, 0.2% American Indian, 1.9% from other races, and 1.8% from two or more races. Those of Hispanic or Latino origin made up 4.5% of the population. In terms of ancestry, 18.7% were English, 18.7% were German, 15.5% were Irish, 7.9% were American, and 5.8% were Italian.

Of the 8,165 households, 24.4% had children under the age of 18 living with them, 49.2% were married couples living together, 10.9% had a female householder with no husband present, 35.4% were non-families, and 29.6% of all households were made up of individuals. The average household size was 2.29 and the average family size was 2.78. The median age was 45.6 years.

The median income for a household in the county was $50,141 and the median income for a family was $63,507. Males had a median income of $41,046 versus $35,161 for females. The per capita income for the county was $29,536. About 5.1% of families and 12.2% of the population were below the poverty line, including 14.9% of those under age 18 and 7.8% of those age 65 or over.

Education
Kent County Public Schools is the school district for all of Kent County.

Kent County High School
Kent County Middle School
Galena Elementary School
Judy Center (Pre-school)
Henry Highland Garnet Elementary School
Rock Hall Elementary School 
Kent School
Chestertown Christian Academy
Echo Hill Outdoor School
Radcliffe Creek School
Washington College
Chesapeake College (supported in part by the county government, but located in Wye Mills, Md.)

Communities
This county contains the following incorporated municipalities:

Towns
Betterton
Chestertown (county seat)
Galena
Millington (partly in Queen Anne's County)
Rock Hall

Census-designated places
The United States Census Bureau recognizes the following Census-designated places in Kent County:
Butlertown
Edesville
Fairlee
Georgetown
Kennedyville
Tolchester
Worton

Unincorporated communities
Other unincorporated places not listed as Census-Designated Places but known in the area include:
Chesterville
Georgetown (CDP) (near Fairlee)
Golts
Hassengers Corner
Langford
Lynch
Massey
Pomona
Sassafras
Sharpstown
Tolchester Beach

Notable people
John Cadwalader (1742-1786), Quaker commander during the American Revolutionary War
James M. Cain (1892 – 1977), author, journalist, and professor
R. Clayton Mitchell Jr. (1936 – 2019), Speaker of the Maryland House of Delegates, 1986–1993. President of the Kent County Commissioners, 1966–1970. Member of the Maryland House of Delegates, 1970–1993
John Needles (1786 – 1878), Quaker abolitionist and a master craftsman of fine furniture
Captain Lambert Wickes, senior officer in the Continental Navy during the Revolutionary War, who took Benjamin Franklin to France in 1777

Miscellaneous
The county's daily newspaper Kent County News.
Kent County Public Schools were some of the last in the country to fully integrate. The federal government stepped up pressure and required a formal plan of integration, which was adopted in 1966. In 1967, there was full and complete integration in Kent County. Construction plans delayed the opening the desegregated high school which opened in the fall of 1971. In 1971, all pupils, regardless of race, reported to the modern high school in Worton. All grades in the Kent County system were integrated before the opening of the centrally located high school.
Kent County, Maryland, is one of the few counties in the United States to border its namesake in another state—in this case, Kent County, Delaware.
In 1790, Kent County contained the centre of population of the United States, according to the US Census Bureau. It is on the edge of a cornfield at 39.16.30 N 76.11.12 W.
Tolchester Beach Amusement Park founded in 1877 by the Tolchester Steamboat Company. As many as 20,000 people visited the resort on summer weekends. It was served by 6 steamers and a ferry. There games of skill and chance and harness racing on a track within the park borders. Included on the grounds were a hotel, pavilion and bathing beach It grew from 10 acres to 155. It was closed in 1962.
The Kent County Railroad Company was formed in 1856. The line was bought by the Pennsylvania Railroad in 1903. The railroads' s primary importance was a means to ship local product to t eastern markets. The railroad continued to operate until early 1970.
Chestertown Fountain Park, the fountain in the park was manufactured by Robert Wood & Company in Philadelphia. It was purchased by the Ladies Improvement Society in 1899 and installed in the Park. The figure of Hebe, goddess of youth and beauty stands atop the fountain.

See also
National Register of Historic Places listings in Kent County, Maryland

References

External links

Kent County official website

 

 
1642 establishments in Maryland
Maryland counties on the Chesapeake Bay
Populated places established in 1642